Silver Streak is a bus rapid transit route between Montclair and Los Angeles operated by Foothill Transit. Between the Montclair TransCenter and the El Monte Bus Station buses travel on the San Bernardino Freeway and between El Monte and Downtown Los Angeles they utilize the El Monte Busway. The service was introduced in 2007 in response to overcrowding on Foothill Transit route 480.

LA Metro’s J Line service, which also uses the El Monte Busway, was introduced in 2009 and since 2012 both agencies have offered a reciprocal fare program allowing pass holders to ride either route between Downtown Los Angeles and El Monte.

History
The express Silver Streak was introduced in 2007 in response to overcrowding on Line 480, Foothill's most popular line. The new service used higher-capacity vehicles and eliminated the many deviations and minor stops on Line 480. It was designed to appeal to discretionary riders. The route is also referred to as Line 707. Silver Streak was introduced with onboard Wi-Fi on the NABI articulated buses.

With the introduction of the Silver Streak, the 'Local Plus Service' on Lines 482, 486, 488, 492, and 494 was converted to local service only, and terminated at El Monte Bus Station; with Line 480 terminating at Westfield West Covina. Passengers were then asked to transfer to Silver Streak, 481 or Metro service to continue to Downtown Los Angeles.

On-board Wi-Fi was discontinued in 2009 due to low usage and to cut costs. Ridership of the Silver Streak fell since the introduction of the Metro J (Silver) Line in 2009.

In October 2012 the rebuilt and expanded El Monte Bus Station opened, and a joint fare program was introduced on the Silver Streak/Metro J Line. This allows the same ticket to be used on either service between the bus station and Downtown LA.

On January 23rd, a weekday-only stop at Cal Poly Pomona was added.

Fares
Metro and Foothill Transit passengers can now ride either the Metro J Line or Foothill's Silver Streak using each other's pass between Downtown Los Angeles and El Monte Station. The program is not eligible outside this range. The joint agreement range of the Silver 2 Silver bus program is only between El Monte Station and Downtown Los Angeles. Effective July 2022, one-way fare is $1.75 for trips of any length, including transfers to Foothill Transit local lines. A discounted fare of $0.75 for seniors, the disabled, and Medicare card holders applies.

List of stops, from East to West

References

Bus rapid transit in California
Transportation in Los Angeles
Transportation in Los Angeles County, California
San Gabriel Valley